Cvetanka Petrova (born 7 November 1991) is a Macedonian footballer who plays as a goalkeeper for the North Macedonia national team.

International career
Petrova made her debut for the North Macedonia national team on 19 September 2009, against Slovakia.

References

1991 births
Living people
Women's association football goalkeepers
Macedonian women's footballers
North Macedonia women's international footballers